Martín Fernández de Navarrete y Ximénez de Tejada (November 9, 1765 – October 8, 1844), was a Spanish noble, grandson of the Marquess of Ximenez de Tejada,  knight of the Order of Malta, politician and historian. He was a Spanish senator and Director of the Spanish Royal Academy of History (1824-1844).

He rediscovered Las Casas' abstract of the journal Columbus kept, known as the Diario, of his first voyage. His principal work is the Colección de los viages y descubrimientos que hicieron por mar los españoles desde fines del siglo XV (Collection of the voyages and discoveries made by the Spaniards since the late 15th century), a vast work published in five volumes that Navarrete wrote by appointment of the Spanish Crown. As a result of this achievement, he has acquired the nickname El Marino Historiador (The Mariner Historian).

Navarrete was a member of all the major Spanish and international Science and Arts Academies of his time.

Early life and military career 

He was born at Ábalos, La Rioja in 1765 in Abalos Palace, the main Fernández de Navarrete family property in La Rioja region. This building currently houses his personal archive, that includes samples of his epistolary relation with some of the most important personalities of the time like Alexander Von Humboldt, Washington Irving or Gaspar Melchor de Jovellanos

His grandfather was Martin Fernández de Navarrete y Zárate (born 1684 in Navarrete) knight of the order of Calatrava, who married Catalina Ramírez de la Piscina, descendant of the king of Navarre and the Cid .

His father was Francisco Fernández de Navarrete Ramirez de la Piscina. His mother was Catalina Ximénez de Tejada y Argaiz, daughter of the Marquess of Ximénez de Tejada and niece of the 69th Grand Master of the Sovereign Military Order of Malta, Francisco Ximénez de Tejada (1700-1774)

Martin Fernández de Navarrete Ximénez de Tejada received part of his education at the Real Seminario de Nobles de Vergara - the Royal Seminary of Nobles located in Vergara. He entered the navy in 1780 and was later engaged in the unsuccessful operations in 1782 during the Great Siege of Gibraltar, and afterwards in the suppression of Algerine pirates.

Health compelled him for a time to withdraw from active service, but he devoted this forced leisure to historical research, and in 1789 he was appointed by the crown to examine the national archives relating to the maritime history of Spain.

The Marine Historian 

He rejoined the navy in 1793 and was present at the siege of Toulon. Afterwards he received command of a frigate.

From 1797 to 1808 he held in succession various important posts in the ministry of marine.

In 1808 the French invasion caused him serious problems, as Napoleon Bonaparte instituted his brother Joseph Bonaparte as king of Spain during the French invasion of Spain (1808-1814).

The French invaders wanted Martín Fernández Navarrete as Minister of the Navy, but Navarrete refused the offer.

This instability finally led to Martin Fernandez de Navarrete to withdraw from Madrid, and made him participate in the Cortes of Cádiz, in Andalusia, where the new Spanish Constitution was being voted while most of the rest of Spain was under occupation by Napoleon's troops .

The rest of his life was entirely devoted to literature and politics. In 1819 appeared, as an appendix to the Academy's edition of Don Quixote, his Vida de Miguel de Cervantes Saavedra, and in 1825 the first two volumes of the Colección de los viajes y descubrimientos que hicieron por mar los españoles desde el fin del siglo XV (3rd vol., 1829; 4th vol., 1837) -Collection of the voyages and discoveries made by the spaniards since the late 15th century.

This vast work was a compendium of the Spanish naval discoveries in America and Asia, that led to the construction of the Spanish Empire.

In 1837 he was made a senator. In 1824 he was appointed director of the Spanish Royal Academy of History. At the time of his death in Madrid in 1844 he was assisting in the preparation of the Colección de Documentos Inéditos para la Historia de España. His Disertación sobre la Historia de la Nautica (1846) and Biblioteca Maritima Española (1851). were published posthumously.

Martín Fernández de Navarrete Ximénez de Tejada portrait painted by the son of great painter Vicente López Portaña is presently presiding the Board of Trustees' hall of the Naval Museum of Madrid.

Another portrait of Martin Fernández de Navarrete Ximénez de Tejada presides the main staircase of the Royal Academy of History in Madrid.

Jobs and distinctions 
Knight of the Order of Malta
Spanish State Counselor  
Spanish Senator  
Director of the Spanish Royal Academy of History (1824-1844)
Vice-protector of the Royal Academy of Noble Arts of San Fernando,  
Dean of the Royal Spanish Academy of Language,  
Born member of the Spanish Admiralty Board  
Great Cross of the Royal American Order of Ysabel la Católica  
Member of the Council of Spain
Member of the Council of the Indies  
Director of Spanish Hydrographic Depot  
Martin Fernández de Navarrete Ximénez de Tejada was also a member of the following academies:
Individual of the Institut de France
Commander of the Legion of Honor of France  
Academy of History of Rio de Janeiro  
Academy of San Lucas of Rome  
Academy of Sciences of Turin  
Academy of Berlin  
Antiquarian Societies of Copenhagen and Normandy  
American Philosophical Society of Philadelphia  
Academies of Geography of Paris and London 
Sociedad Economica Matritense 

and of several other Academies of the Kingdom of Spain

Main works 

 Fernández de Navarrete, Martín (1825–37) Colección de los viages y descubrimientos que hicieron por mar los españoles desde fines del siglo XV: con varios documentos inéditos concernientes á la historia de la marina castellana y de los establecimientos españoles en Indias, 5 vols., Madrid: Imprensa Real. v.1 (1825), v.2 (1825), v.3 (1829), v.4 (1837), v. 5 (1837)
 Vida de Miguel de Cervantes Saavedra, escrita e ilustrada con varias noticias y documentos inéditos pertenecientes a la historia y literatura de su tiempo. Madrid, 1819.[1]
 Disertación sobre la historia de la náutica. Madrid, 1846.
 Biblioteca marítima española. Obra póstuma del señor Martín Fernández de Navarrete. Madrid: Viuda de Calero, 1851, 2 volúmenes.
 Viajes de Américo Vespucio. Ed. Espasa-Calpe. Madrid, 2003. .
 Colección de Documentos Inéditos para la Historia de España. Inacabado. Madrid, 1844.
 Disertación Histórica sobre la parte que tuvieron los españoles en las guerras de Ultramar o de las Cruzadas [...]. Tomo V. Real Academia de la Historia. Madrid . 1816

References

Bibliography

 Fernández de Navarrete, Martín  (1825–37) Colección de los viages y descubrimientos que hicieron por mar los españoles desde fines del siglo XV: con varios documentos inéditos concernientes á la historia de la marina castellana y de los establecimientos españoles en Indias, 4 vols.,  Madrid: Imprensa Real.v.1 (1825), v.2 (1825), v.3 (1829), v.4 (1837).
 Cáseda Teresa, J. F. Martín Fernández de Navarrete y la literatura de su tiempo. Instituto de Estudios Riojanos. Gibierno de la Rioja. Logroño, 2000. 
 Juretschke, Hans. Los Afrancesados en la Guerra de la Independencia. Biblioteca de la Historia de España. SARPE, Madrid 1986. 
 Pando Villarroya, José Luis de. Colón y Fernández de Navarrete. Pando Ediciones . Madrid. 1984. 
 Instituto de Historia y Cultura Naval. Martín Fernández de Navarrete. El marino Historiador. (1765-1844). Cuadernos Monográficos del Instituto de Historia y Cultura Naval. Nº 24 Madrid. 1995.

External links
 

1765 births
1844 deaths
People from La Rioja
Spanish naval officers
Maritime historians
Afrancesados